The Helical engine is a proposed spacecraft propulsion drive that, like other reactionless drives, would violate the laws of physics.

The concept was proposed by David M. Burns, formerly a NASA engineer at the Marshall Space Flight Center in Alabama, in a non-peer-reviewed report published on a NASA server in 2019 describing it as "A new concept for in-space propulsion is proposed in which propellant is not ejected from the engine, but instead is captured to create a nearly infinite specific impulse".

The Helical engine accelerates ions that are confined in a locked loop. Once they are accelerated, the system changes the velocity of the ions in order to change their momentum. Afterward, Burns hypothesized that the engine, by moving the ions along its axis, could produce thrust. The proposed engine is mainly intended to be used to maintain the orbit of satellite stations during long periods of time without the need of refueling.

See also 
 EmDrive

References 

Fringe physics
Hypothetical technology
Pseudoscience
Spacecraft propulsion